Mosque lamps of enamelled glass, often with gilding, survive in considerable numbers from the Islamic art of the Middle Ages, especially the 13th and 14th centuries, with Cairo in Egypt and Aleppo and Damascus in Syria the most important centres of production.  They are oil lamps, usually with a large round bulbous body rising to a narrower waist, above which the top section is flared.  There is usually a foot so they can be placed on a surface, but they were normally used suspended by chains that went through a number of loops on the outside of the body.  They were used to light mosques and other buildings in mosque complexes, in large spaces in groups hanging from a circular metal frame.  The circular frames continue to be used in many mosques today, but with plain or frosted glass lamps for electric lighting.

Manufacture
The techniques used are typical of contemporary Islamic glass, with the enamel decoration applied to a pre-fired plain body, and the whole then fired for a second time. 
The coloured decoration may include Qur'anic verses, especially the first part of the Ayat an-Nur or "Verse of Light" (24:35, see below), inscriptions and heraldic emblems recording the donor, as well as purely decorative motifs.  By the 15th century production of all types of fine glass was in steep decline, a sign of which is that in 1569 the Ottoman Grand Vizier Sokullu Mehmed Pacha ordered 600 plain lamps of Venetian glass, perhaps to be decorated elsewhere.

The Ottomans also made lamps of similar form in Iznik pottery, and Shah Abbas I of Persia gave plain silver lamps to hang by the tomb of Shaykh Safi at Ardabil; Persian miniatures show other examples from the 16th century in gold or brass and silver.  Such opaque materials were much less effective as lighting, but the purpose of the lamp was symbolic as well as practical, related to the "Verse of Light".  Mosque lamps are often shown in profile at the head of a prayer rug for the same reason.  The decoration of the lamps often includes either the name or the symbol from Islamic heraldry of the donor, who usually gave a group of lamps.  Other types of lighting in mosques were large metal lamp stands, like very wide candlesticks, which were also used in secular buildings.  These could be very intricately decorated.

Later types

The elaborate decorated types were mostly succeeded by plain glass oil lamps with a simple rim at the top, by which they were attached to (typically) a circular metal bar. Often these hang in tiers. Mosques today typically retain the hanging circular fittings, but use electric lights and glass shades of various sorts, not essentially different from other glass lampshades used in lighting other buildings.

Collecting

In 2000, three 14th-century Mamluk mosque lamps in pristine condition from the collection of Bethsabée de Rothschild sold at Christie's in London for £1,763,750 (US$2,582K), £993,750 (US$1,455K) and £641,750 (US$937K). In the second half of the 19th century, a number of forgeries, or expensive glass ornaments in the style of Mamluk lamps were produced in France and Italy.

The Verse of Light
Qur'an 24:35:

References

Further reading
Canby, Sheila R. (ed). Shah Abbas; The Remaking of Iran, 2009, British Museum Press, 
Jones, Dalu & Michell, George, (eds); The Arts of Islam, Arts Council of Great Britain, 1976, 
Perry, Carolyn, The Light of Allah, Times Educational Supplement, 17 January 2003

External links

Islamic architectural elements
Islamic art
Glass art
Types of lamp
Mosque architecture